The Millat Party (Urdu: ملت پارٹی) was a political party in Pakistan, formed by Sardar Farooq Ahmad Khan Leghari, former president of Pakistan, once he was no longer the president, and needed a platform to survive politically. He had the money to start a small-scale party. Because of his support to the establishment, a number of people joined him. Millat Party was part of the ruling coalition where it is represented by  Sardar Farooq Leghari's son, Owais Leghari.
At the last legislative elections on 20 October 2002, the party was part of the National Alliance that won 4.6% of the popular vote, and 12 out of 272 elected members.

In May 2004, Millat Party merged with PML (Q) along with other parties to form the united Pakistan Muslim League.

References

Defunct political parties in Pakistan